Charles "Chico" Vaughn (February 19, 1940 – October 25, 2013) was an American basketball player. At 6'2", he played the guard position.

Vaughn is the highest scorer in Illinois high school boys basketball, tallying 3,358 points during his career at Egyptian High School in Tamms, Illinois (1954–1958). He was born in nearby Hodges Park, Illinois, then moved with his family to Portland, Oregon before returning to Tamms at age 7.

Vaughn also is the all-time leading scorer for Southern Illinois, where he scored 2,088 points for the Salukis and had his uniform number (20) retired by the school. He had an unorthodox behind the head release that made his shot difficult to block.

After leaving college, Vaughn played five seasons (1962–67) in the National Basketball Association as a member of the St. Louis Hawks and Detroit Pistons. He joined the rival American Basketball Association in 1967 and played three seasons there as a member of the Pittsburgh/Minnesota Pipers. Vaughn was the fourth leading scorer (19.9 points per game) on the 1967–68 Pipers team which won the 1968 ABA Championship.

Vaughn returned to SIU to obtain his college diploma in 1988.

He died on October 26, 2013 of cancer at the age of 73.

References

External links 
 Career statistics
 Illinois High School Leading Scorers

1940 births
2013 deaths
American men's basketball players
Basketball players from Portland, Oregon
Detroit Pistons players
Minnesota Pipers players
Pittsburgh Pipers players
Point guards
San Diego Rockets expansion draft picks
Shooting guards
Southern Illinois Salukis men's basketball players
St. Louis Hawks draft picks
St. Louis Hawks players